Ho Sheng-lung (1954–2015) was a Taiwanese politician.

Ho served on the Keelung City Council for two terms, totaling eight years, before winning a by-election to represent Keelung in the Legislative Yuan. He took office on 26 January 1998, replacing Lee Chin-yung, who had vacated the seat to serve as Mayor of Keelung. Ho left the Third Legislative Yuan on 29 January 1999, two days before its term ended. In 2014, after , Keelung City Council speaker and mayoral candidate, became subject to an investigation, Ho called on the Kuomintang to select another candidate for the Keelung mayoralty, and for Huang to willingly withdraw from the election. Ho died, aged 62, at the Keelung Chang Gung Memorial Hospital on 21 July 2015, where he was seeking treatment for liver cancer.

References

1954 births
2015 deaths
Members of the 3rd Legislative Yuan
Kuomintang Members of the Legislative Yuan in Taiwan
Keelung Members of the Legislative Yuan
Taiwanese city councilors
Deaths from cancer in Taiwan
Deaths from liver cancer